Ludwin-Kolonia  is a village in the administrative district of Gmina Ludwin, within Łęczna County, Lublin Voivodeship, in eastern Poland.

References

Ludwin-Kolonia